Thomas McClaren Brown (May 22, 1921 – June 4, 2013) was a professional American football player for the National Football League's Pittsburgh Steelers. His position was end. He played in nine games in the 1942 season after his collegiate career at William & Mary.

References

1921 births
2013 deaths
American football ends
Pittsburgh Steelers players
Players of American football from Pittsburgh
William & Mary Tribe football players